Highgate Hill is a riverside inner southern suburb of the City of Brisbane, Queensland, Australia.

Geography 
Together with West End and South Brisbane, it occupies a peninsula surrounded on three sides by the Brisbane River. From the central ridge occupied by Dornoch Terrace, land slopes steeply down towards the river to the south and north towards low-lying land of the two adjacent suburbs. To the east, further hilly land extends past Gladstone Road.

Highgate Hill is a high-density residential suburb with many apartment buildings, some more than 10 storeys. These apartment blocks are centered along the main road of Dornoch Terrace, a trend that was started in 1960 by the landmark Torbreck building. Proximity to and views of the Brisbane central business district have drawn residents to the area.

History 

Before British settlement, the Highgate Hill area was a hunting ground for indigenous people from nearby camping grounds, such as the one at the base of Highgate Hill. Up until the late 1850s this camp, near Dorchester Street and Somerville House School, continued to be used. A corroboree ground was located at "the pineapple paddock" in Baynes Street. The name of the Highgate Hill area in the Turrbal or Jagara language was  Beenung-urrung which meant frilled lizard.

The banks of the Brisbane River were described as a tropic wall of tall figs, emergent hoop pine, vines, flowering creepers, staghorns, elkhorns, towering scrub palms, giant ferns, and hundreds of other varieties of ferns, beautiful and rare orchids, and wild passion flower. Remnants of this vegetation exist in a number gullies in Highgate Hill leading to the river.

In convict times, saw pits existed in the area along the river between Dauphin Terrace and Boundary Street. Convicts felled timber on Highgate Hill for use in the fledgling town of Brisbane.

Among the first European residents was George Wilson and his wife and family of 8 who built a homestead in Bellevue Street in the 1860s. He is thought to have named the locality Highgate Hill (possibly after Highgate Hill in London), however the name first appears in an advertisement for a land sale in 1864 by Nehemiah Bartley of the "Highgate Hill Estate" located at the peak of the hill. The large portions of land from early land sales were slowly subdivided into residential blocks, and advertisements mentioned the notable residents of the area to emphasise its attractiveness. However the lack of water proved to be an obstacle to significant take up. Water had to be collected in rain water tanks when possible or fetched from springs in the West End area. This problem was solved by the completion in 1889 of the Highgate Hill Service Reservoir near the corner of Dornoch Terrace and Gladstone Road. The reservoir is still in use today

In 1902, the electric tram was extended up Gladstone Road, stimulating suburban growth. By 1929 the area was considered one of Brisbane's dress circles.

The density of the suburb began to increase with redevelopment and the building of flats during the interwar years. Westbourne Street provides a good example of the redevelopment of large properties in this period.

On 10 December 1949, the foundation stone of the Park Presbyterian Church was laid at 21 Hampstead Road. The congregation had previously had their church at 31 Glenelg Street on the corner of Cordelia Street in South Brisbane but the changing demographic of South Brisbane into an industrial area saw families move away to more residential suburbs and so the decision was made to build a new church in the more residential suburb of Highgate Hill. The name "Park" was carried over from the previous church which had been located opposite Musgrave Park. When the Presbyterian church entered into the union that created the Uniting Church in Australia in the 1970s, this resulted in an oversupply of church buildings in many communities. In September 1976 the Park Presbyterian church became the Park Uniting Church for the Brisbane Tongan congregation.

Development continued after the Second World War with the notable construction of the 22-floor Torbreck, Brisbane's first apartment tower, on Dornoch Terrace in 1962.

Continued development has led to community protest at times. In 2002 there was extended protest over the development of two hectares of bushland, known as the Gully, when a developer obtained a permit for nearly 30 dwellings to be built on it. In 2016, there was community protest over the demolition of three heritage houses in Jones Street which had not been given heritage listing by the Brisbane City Council.

The median age of the Highgate Hill population was 34 years of age, 3 years below the Australian median. 59.2% of people living in Highgate Hill were born in Australia, compared to the national average of 69.8%; the next most common countries of birth were England 3.9%, Greece 3.8%, New Zealand 3%, China 1.8%, India 1.7%. 66.3% of people spoke only English at home; the next most common languages were 7.9% Greek, 2.5% Mandarin, 1.7% Vietnamese, 1.6% Spanish, 1% French.

Transport 

Highgate Hill is serviced by a number of bus services operated by the Brisbane City Council. These are the following.

 Number 192 UQ Lakes - Highgate Hill - City
 Number 196 New Farm - Fairfield Gardens
 Number 198 Highgate Hill Hail and Ride local bus
The nearest train stations to Highgate Hill are at South Bank Railway Station and Dutton Park Railway Station . On the eastern side of the suburb Gloucester Street railway station once provided better rail access. The station was removed in 1978, with little indication of its existence remaining.

Schools 
There are no schools in Highgate Hill.

Highgate Hill is served by a number of schools in nearby suburbs, including West End State School (1875), Dutton Park State School (1884) St. Ita's Primary School in Dutton Park and Brisbane State High School, South Brisbane.

There has been some concern about the availability of sufficient school places following the rapid development in the area. In June 2017, the Queensland Government announced plans for the building of a new high school and expansion of the West End State School.

Amenities 
Park Church Tongan Congregation is at  21-23 Hampstead Road. It is part of the Moreton Rivers Presbytery of the Uniting Church in Australia.

Parks 
At the highest point of Highgate Hill is a small park which boasts excellent views of the city and surrounding hills. It's particularly popular during summer due to the cool breezes.

Lyons Playground Park, also known as Paradise Park, is a well equipped small park that also has a community garden.

The Brydon Street park leads into a gully down to the river and is what remains of the bushland that was subject to protest in 2002.

Highgate Hill in literature and art 
The 1994 novel for children, ''The Highgate Hill Mob'' relates the escapades of four kids who live in the suburb of Highgate Hill.

The artist Stephen Nothling lived in Louise Street, Highgate Hill and painted a series of pictures depicting houses in the street.

The poet Robert Hughes lived in Jones Street. He wrote his book "Highgate Hill" based on this experience.

Heritage listings

Highgate Hill has a number of heritage-listed sites, including:

Prominent people
The following prominent people have an association with Highgate Hill:

 James Allan (politician and retailer) - residence Wairuna
 Ron Archer (cricketer) - birth
 Benjamin Harris Babbidge (alderman and mayor) - residence
 William Theophilus Blakeney (registrar-general) - residence
 Bill Hayden (former Governor-General of Australia, politician) - birth and early years
Daphne Mayo (artist, sculptor) - residence
 John McLaren (cricketer) - death
 Edmund Sheppard (judge) - residence
 Alfred Jeffris Turner (pediatrician and entomologist) - residence
 Andrew Joseph Thynne (lawyer and politician) - residence
Alexander Brown Wilson (architect) - early residence

See also

 List of Brisbane suburbs

References

External links

 

 
Suburbs of the City of Brisbane